Manta was founded in 1998 after the purchase of the franchise rights from the defunct Manta Sport. From 1999–2001, the club competed in the Segunda Categoría, the third tier of Ecuadorian football league system before being promoted in 2002 to Serie. Manta won promotion again in 2003 to Serie A for the first time but finished poorly and were relegated back to Serie B where they would spend the next 6 seasons. 2009 saw the club back in Serie A but no titles were forthcoming and they were relegated again in 2014.

They got promoted back to the Ecuadorian Serie A in 2020 and will play in the first tier after a 7 year absence.

Honours
Serie B (1): 2008

Players

–

Managers
 Fabián Bustos (July 14, 2009 – Dec 15, 2010)
 Gabriel Perrone (Dec 15, 2010 – May 3, 2011)
 Armando Osma (Aug 30, 2011 – Dec 13, 2012)
 Edwin Cózar (Dec 15, 2012 – June 30, 2013)
 Fabián Bustos (July 2, 2013 – Dec 31, 2013)
 Juan Manuel Llop (Jan 1, 2014 – Aug 1, 2014)
 Jorge Alfonso (Aug 1, 2014 – Jan 1, 2015)
 Jefferson Huerta (Jan 1, 2015–)

External links
Official website 

Manta, Futbol Club
Manta, Futbol Club
1998 establishments in Ecuador
Manta, Ecuador